Karen E. Bender is an American novelist.

Biography
Karen E. Bender is the author of the short story collection Refund, which was a Finalist for the National Book Award in fiction for 2015, and on the shortlist for the 2015 Frank O'Connor International Short Story Award, and the novels A Town of Empty Rooms and Like Normal People; Like Normal People was a Los Angeles Times Bestseller, and a Washington Post Best Book of the Year. Both her collections Refund and The New Order were Longlisted for the Story prize. 

Writing about "A Town of Empty Rooms," reviewer S. Kirk Walsh said in the Boston Globe, 

Bender has taught fiction writing for the MFA programs at Hollins University, Chatham University, Tunghai University in Taiwan, and the University of North Carolina Wilmington. She is on the Core faculty for Alma College and is a Visiting Writer at the MFA program at SUNY Stony Brook. 

  She has received grants from the Rona Jaffe Foundation and the National Endowment for the Arts. She is also co-editor of the nonfiction anthology Choice.

Her short stories have appeared in magazines, including The New Yorker, Granta, Ploughshares, Zoetrope, Story, The Kenyon Review, Guernica, Narrative, The Harvard Review and The Iowa Review. Her fiction has been anthologized in the Best American Short Stories, Best American Mystery Stories, New Stories from the South and The Pushcart Prize series and has been read as part of the "Selected Short" series at Symphony Space in New York. Her work has also been read by Levar Burton as part of his series "Levar Burton Reads." 

She has written nonfiction for The New York Times, Real Simple, O magazine  and others.

Works

 The Fourth Prussian Dynasty, The New Yorker https://www.newyorker.com/magazine/1999/09/13/for-the-fourth-prussian-dynasty-by-karen-e-bender
  Like Normal People,  Houghton Mifflin Harcourt, 2000.  
 A town of empty rooms, Berkeley, CA Counterpoint 2013. , 
 Refund : stories, Berkeley, CA : Counterpoint Press, 2015. , 
 New Order : Stories., Counterpoint Press 2018. ,

References

External links
Novelist Karen Bender - Like Normal People, LukeFord, August 18, 2006
Writers Corner, NEA

Iowa Writers' Workshop alumni
20th-century American novelists
Writers from Los Angeles
American women novelists
American women short story writers
Living people
20th-century American women writers
20th-century American short story writers
Year of birth missing (living people)
21st-century American women
Academic staff of Tunghai University